Sat Masjid Road or Shat Moshjid Road is a long road in the western part of Dhaka connecting Mohammadpur and Mirpur Road near Bangladesh Council of Scientific and Industrial Research (BCSIR), commonly known simply as "Science Laboratory". The road runs through Dhanmondi and passes by the Pilkhana headquarters of the former Bangladesh Rifles (now Border Guard Bangladesh). It was named after the Sat Gambuj Mosque, colloquially called Sat Masjid (or Shat Moshjid), one of the aesthetic Mughal-era mosques of Bangladesh located near the Mohammadpur end. It is one of the major roads of Dhanmondi thana and prominent for housing many banks, restaurants, universities and colleges, apartment blocks, offices and other institutions.

References

Streets in Dhaka
Dhanmondi
Odonyms referring to a building
Odonyms referring to religion